This is a list of minister from D. V. Sadananda Gowda cabinets starting from 4 August 2011 to 12 July 2012. D. V. Sadananda Gowda is the leader of Bharatiya Janata Party was sworn in the Chief Ministers of Karnataka on 4 August 2011. Here is the list of the ministers of his ministry.

Council of Ministers

|}

See also 

 Government of Karnataka
 Karnataka Legislative Assembly

References

Bharatiya Janata Party state ministries
2011 in Indian politics
Sadananda Gowda
Cabinets established in 2011
Cabinets disestablished in 2012
2011 establishments in Karnataka
2012 disestablishments in India